Crisis on Cloud City is a 1989 role-playing game adventure for Star Wars: The Roleplaying Game published by West End Games.

Plot summary
Crisis on Cloud City is an adventure in which a crazy super-droid, an Imperial spy and a virus are all let loose in the floating Cloud City; the adventure also introduces a deck of cards and rules for the game Sabacc.

Publication history
Crisis on Cloud City was written by Christopher Kubasik, with a cover by Ralph McQuarrie, and was published by West End Games in 1989 as a 40-page book, a rules sheet, and a cardstock cards sheet.

Reception
Lee Brimmicombe-Wood reviewed Crisis on Cloud City for Games International magazine, and gave it a rating of 4 out of 10, and stated that "The card deck and West End's usual excellent production make Crisis an attractive package. I just wonder, though, when they are going to bring out more scenarios that ring true to the Star Wars universe, and don't just ape other SF games and themes."

References

External links

Role-playing game supplements introduced in 1989
Star Wars: The Roleplaying Game adventures